Oberea alexandrovi is a species of beetle in the family Cerambycidae. It was described by Nikolay Nikolaevich Plavilstshchikov in 1921.

References

alexandrovi
Beetles described in 1921